Lepa Brena (The Best Of - Dupli CD) is a compilation album released by Yugoslav pop-folk singer Lepa Brena in 2003. Even though her albums date back to 1981, many of the songs on this album are remastered and several are even rerecorded, so the versions are totally different from their originals.

This is her second compilation album, the first being Lepa Brena & Slatki Greh (1990).

Track listing
Disc 1:

Disc 2:

References

2004 compilation albums
Lepa Brena albums
Grand Production albums